The Daniel Billmeyer House is a historic house in the Mount Airy section of Philadelphia, Pennsylvania. The 1793 section of the house was built by printer and wealthy businessman Michael Billmeyer for his son Daniel.

The house was built in two sections.  The first was built c. 1730 and was occupied by British troops during the Battle of Germantown.  A major focus of this battle was the larger house Cliveden, one block to the southeast, which was also occupied by British troops.  The second section of the house, which is visible from Germantown Avenue, was built in 1793 during the yellow fever epidemic.

During the later part of the nineteenth century architect Walter Cope lived in the house.

The house was added to the National Register of Historic Places in 1971. It is a contributing property of the Colonial Germantown Historic District. The Michael Billmeyer House, located across the street, is also listed on the NRHP.

References

Houses on the National Register of Historic Places in Philadelphia
Federal architecture in Pennsylvania
Houses completed in 1793
Individually listed contributing properties to historic districts on the National Register in Pennsylvania
Mount Airy, Philadelphia
National Historic Landmark District contributing properties